Upon a Burning Body is an American metalcore band from San Antonio, Texas, formed in 2005. The band currently consists of vocalist Danny Leal, guitarist Ruben Alvarez, drummer Tito Felix and bassist Thomas Alvarez. Their second studio album, Red. White. Green., debuted at No. 105 on the Billboard 200 in 2012. Their third studio album The World Is My Enemy Now, released on 12 August 2014, performed even better, debuting at No. 39 on the Billboard 200 of that year. while in the same year joining the successful American-based heavy metal band Five Finger Death Punch on their tour as their support act with a very successful gig at 013 Tilburg stage in the Netherlands. In March 2014. The band released their fourth studio album Straight from the Barrio on October 28, 2016. The band is currently signed to Seek & Strike Records.

Members
Current
 Danny Leal – lead vocals 
 Ruben Alvarez – rhythm guitar ; backing vocals ; lead guitar ; bass 
 Tito Felix – drums, percussion 
 Thomas Alvarez – bass, backing vocals 

Former
 Juan Hinojosa – drums, percussion 
 Chris "CJ" Johnson – rhythm guitar 
 Seth Webster – bass 
 Jonathon Gonzales – drums, percussion 
 Ramon "Lord Cocos" Villarreal – drums, percussion 
 Sal Dominguez – lead guitar 
 Rey Martinez – bass 
 Joe Antonellis – bass 

Timeline

Discography

Studio albums

Extended plays
Genocide (2005)
Built from War (2020)

Singles
 "Sin City" (2012)
 "Once Upon a Time in Mexico" (2012)
 "Scars" (2014)
 "Red Razor Wrists" (2014)
 "Bring the Rain" (2014)
 "Til the Break of Dawn" (2016)
 "Already Broken" (2016)
 "Remenissions" (2018)
 "King of Diamonds" (2019)
 "Reinventing Hatred" (2019)
 "All Pride No Pain" (2019)
 "Built from War" (2020)
 "5x3" (2020)
 "Chains of Agony" (2020)
 "Snake Eyes" (2021)

Demos
Upon a Burning Body (2005)

References

External links

2005 establishments in Texas
American deathcore musical groups
Heavy metal musical groups from Texas
Musical groups established in 2005
Musical groups from San Antonio
Musical quartets
Sumerian Records artists
Metalcore musical groups from Texas